Luzhu may refer to:

Luzhu District, Taoyuan (蘆竹區), Taiwan
Lujhu District, Kaohsiung (路竹區), Taiwan
Luzhu, Fuyang, Zhejiang (渌渚镇), town in Fuyang, Zhejiang, People's Republic of China

See also
Lüzhu
Luzhu huoshao